The Faltschonhorn is a mountain of the Swiss Lepontine Alps, located west of Vals in the canton of Graubünden. It lies on the range between the Val Lumnezia and the Valser Tal, south of Piz Aul.

References

External links
 Faltschonhorn on Hikr

Mountains of the Alps
Mountains of Switzerland
Mountains of Graubünden
Lepontine Alps